Danny Kingston (born 12 February 1973) is a British judoka.

Judo career
Kingston became champion of Great Britain, winning the lightweight division at the British Judo Championships in 1993. Three years later he won the gold medal at the 1996 European Judo Championships.

Other achievements

References

External links
 

1973 births
Living people
British male judoka
Olympic judoka of Great Britain
Judoka at the 1996 Summer Olympics